Group A of the 1997 Fed Cup Asia/Oceania Zone Group I was one of two pools in the Asia/Oceania Zone Group I of the 1997 Fed Cup. Four teams competed in a round robin competition, with the top two teams and the bottom two teams proceeding to their respective sections of the play-offs: the top teams played for advancement to the World Group Play-offs, while the bottom teams faced potential relegation to Group II.

Indonesia vs. New Zealand

Chinese Taipei vs. India

Indonesia vs. India

Chinese Taipei vs. New Zealand

Indonesia vs. Chinese Taipei

New Zealand vs. India

See also
Fed Cup structure

References

External links
 Fed Cup website

1997 Fed Cup Asia/Oceania Zone